Shukriya Khanum (c.1935 – 14 May 2017, Lahore) was a Pakistani pilot. She was the country's first woman to become a commercial pilot in 1959. Though not allowed to fly commercially herself, she spent her career with the national airline, Pakistan International Airlines (PIA) teaching others.

Education 
Shukriya graduated from Government College Karachi in 1959. Shukriya Khanum took her flying lessons from Lahore Flying Academy at Walton Airport, Lahore.

Career 
Shukriya obtained her flying license immediately after her graduation in 1959. She started her career with the national airline, Pakistan International Airlines (PIA). However at that time, rules did not permit women to fly a commercial plane, so Shukriya took up a job of flying instructor at the PIA flight club where she taught flying to new cadets. She would also take flying enthusiasts on rides at the Karachi flying club.

In the late 1970s, when martial law was imposed, during the General Zia-ul-Haq regime, rules had become strict and many laws were implemented that objected the idea of men and women working in the same area and so Shukriya was barred from flying at all, as Zia's rules objected men and women from flying together. Shukriya was then restricted to the job of an on-ground flight instructor. During her career, Shukriya was not able to serve as a pilot. The first female commercial pilot, who could fly without any gender restrictions was Rabia, who obtained her license thirty years after Shukriya. In 1989, Rabia met Shukriya in Karachi. Shukriya was happy to see her and said in her own words "to focus on professionalism and never let anybody think that because you are a woman you cannot do that".

Death 
Khanum died on 14 May 2017 at the age of 82 due to liver cancer which she had been fighting for several years. She died in Shaukat Khanum Hospital, Lahore.

References 

2017 deaths
Pakistani aviators
Pakistani women aviators
Women aviators